Sitara is a Pakistani former film actress known for her works mostly in Punjabi and Urdu cinema.

Career
She entered the film industry in 1984 and made her debut with the Punjabi film Dil Maa Da. During her film career she appeared in 10 Urdu, 19 Punjabi and 4 Pashto films.

Filmography

References

20th-century Pakistani actresses
Actresses in Punjabi cinema
Actresses in Urdu cinema
Actresses in Pashto cinema
Place of birth missing (living people)
Year of birth missing
Possibly living people